The USGF International Invitational was a gymnastics tournament organized by the U.S. Gymnastics Federation (USGF) in Hartford, Connecticut as part of the U.S.-led 1980 Olympic boycott. Competitors were invited from nations not competing in the 1980 Olympic tournament in Moscow. Participants came from Japan, China, the USA, Switzerland, West Germany, Italy, Norway, Korea, Canada, New Zealand and Israel. Similar events in other Olympic sports included the Liberty Bell Classic in athletics.

Results

Men's Events

Women's events

See also
 Gymnastics at the Friendship Games, similar event as part of the 1984 Soviet-led Olympic boycott

References

External links
 Hidden History: Amid 1980 Boycott, U.S. Gymnasts Turned To Hartford, Hartford Courant

Cold War
International sports boycotts
Olympic Games controversies
1980 Summer Olympics
1980 in gymnastics
International gymnastics competitions hosted by the United States
Sports in Hartford, Connecticut
Sports competitions in Hartford, Connecticut
Sports competitions in Connecticut
1980 in sports in Connecticut